Teohari is a Romanian name that may refer to:

Surname
 Claudiu Teohari (born 1981), Romanian stand up-comedian, writer, and actor
 Maria Teohari (1885–1975), Romanian astronomer

Given name
  (1866–1910), archaeologist
 Teohari Georgescu (1908–1976), member of the Romanian Communist Party

Romanian-language surnames
Romanian masculine given names